"When You Get to the Heart" is a song recorded by American country music artist Barbara Mandrell featuring The Oak Ridge Boys.  It was released in March 1986 as the third and final single from the album  Get to the Heart.  The song reached #20 on the Billboard Hot Country Singles & Tracks chart.  The song was written by Wayland Holyfield, Norro Wilson and Tony Brown.

Chart performance

References

1986 singles
1985 songs
Barbara Mandrell songs
The Oak Ridge Boys songs
Songs written by Tony Brown (record producer)
Songs written by Wayland Holyfield
Songs written by Norro Wilson
Song recordings produced by Tom Collins (record producer)
MCA Records singles
Vocal collaborations